Henri Charles Louis Romagnesi (7 February 1912 – 18 January 1999) was a French mycologist who was notable for a thorough review and monograph of the agaric genus Entoloma (or Rhodophyllus as it was known in the early 20th century), as well as extensive work on the large genus Russula, of which he described several new species.

See also
List of mycologists

References

1912 births
1999 deaths
French mycologists
Russula
20th-century French botanists